Ireland competed at the 2002 Winter Olympics in Salt Lake City, United States.

The Irish team failed to secure any medals, with Clifton Wrottesley securing the highest finishing position by coming 4th in the Skeleton event.

Alpine skiing

Men

Men's combined

Women

Bobsleigh

Men

Cross-country skiing

Men's sprint

Skeleton

Men

References
Official Olympic Reports
 Olympic Winter Games 2002, full results by sports-reference.com

Nations at the 2002 Winter Olympics
2002 Winter Olympics
2002 in Irish sport